Englishman Bay is a bay in Washington County, Maine.

The bay is located between the towns of Roque Bluffs and Jonesport. It is separated from Chandler Bay to the southwest by Roque Island and Great Spruce Island.

References

Bays of Washington County, Maine
Jonesport, Maine
Bays of Maine